Wang Senhao (January 1933 – 10 April 2022) was a People's Republic of China politician. He was born in Cixi City, Zhejiang. He joined the Chinese Communist Party in 1955. He was governor of Shanxi. Wang died on 10 April 2022, at the age of 89.

References

1933 births
2022 deaths
People's Republic of China politicians from Zhejiang
Chinese Communist Party politicians from Zhejiang
Governors of Shanxi
Members of the Standing Committee of the 9th Chinese People's Political Consultative Conference
Delegates to the 6th National People's Congress
Delegates to the 7th National People's Congress